Dilanchi Arkhi-ye Olya (also Romanized as Dīlānchī Arkhī-ye ‘Olyā and Dīlanchī Arkhī-ye‘olyā) is a village in Solduz Rural District, in the Central District of Naqadeh County, West Azerbaijan Province, Iran. At the 2006 census, its population was 344, in 62 families.

References 

Populated places in Naqadeh County